Canada Butler (1821 - December 12, 1862) was a state legislator in Alabama. He lived in Poplar Ridge, Alabama in Madison County, Alabama. He was a Republican. He died “on duty” and is buried in Montgomery.

He was born 1821 in Tennessee to Samuel and Margaret (née Layman) Butler.

He served in the Alabama House of Representatives in 1862.

He married Nancy Maples and they had 7 children of which  James Edward Butler was their eldest and Samuel Riley Butler their grandson.

He died Friday December 12, 1862 after being ill for a week.

References

19th-century American politicians
Republican Party members of the Alabama House of Representatives
1821 births
1862 deaths
People from Madison County, Alabama